The Sweden men's national under-16 basketball team is the national representative for Sweden in international under-16 basketball tournaments.  The team is administered by the Svenska Basketbollförbundet.

At the 2007 U16 European Championship Division B, Sweden captured their first ever medal as they won the third place game to win the bronze, and completing the feat twice more in 2012 and 2015.

FIBA U16 European Championship participations

See also
Sweden men's national basketball team
Sweden men's national under-18 basketball team

References

External links
Official website 
Archived records of Sweden team participations

Basketball in Sweden
basketball
Men's national under-16 basketball teams